Vanga Anil Kumar is a Film Publicity Designer whose screen name is Anil Bhanu along with his partner Bhanu Avirineni. Anil is the co-founder of Anil Bhanu Core Design. He has designed posters and has done film publicity for more than 100 films. There are around 30 yet-to-be-released films for which they are doing publicity right now. Anil joined hands

with Bhanu after completing his 2-year multimedia course.

Filmography 
Anil Bhanu designed publicity material for Nearly 100 Films Including Telugu and Hindi Languages. Below are few of them.

References

1974 births
Living people